The 1908 European Rowing Championships were rowing championships held in the Swizz city of Lucerne. The competition, held on 30 August, was for men only and they competed in five boat classes (M1x, M2x, M2+, M4+, M8+). Many of the rowers had a month earlier competed at the 1908 Summer Olympics in London.

Medal summary
Four nations (Belgium, France, Italy, and Switzerland) competed in five events.

Footnotes

References

European Rowing Championships
Rowing
Sport in Lucerne
European Rowing Championships
Rowing
European Rowing Championships